Health and usage monitoring systems (HUMS) is a generic term given to activities that utilize data collection and analysis techniques to help ensure availability, reliability and safety of vehicles. Activities similar to, or sometimes used interchangeably with, HUMS include condition-based maintenance (CBM) and operational data recording (ODR). This term HUMS is often used in reference to airborne craft and in particular rotor-craft – the term is cited as being introduced by the offshore oil industry after a commercial Chinook crashed in the North Sea, killing all but one passenger and one crew member in 1986.

HUMS technology and regulation continues to be developed.

HUMS are now used not only for safety but for a number of other reasons including 

 Maintenance: reduced mission aborts, fewer instances of aircraft on ground (AOG), simplified logistics for fleet deployment
 Cost: “maintain as you fly” maintenance flights are not required. Performing repairs when the damage is minor increases the aircraft mean time before failure (MTBF) and decreases the mean time to repair (MTTR)
 Operational: improved flight safety, mission reliability and effectiveness
 Performance: improved aircraft performance and reduced fuel consumption

Recent advances in the technology include predictive algorithms providing Remaining Useful Life estimates of components and automated wireless data transfer from the aircraft via WiFi or Cellular.

References

External links 
 United Electronic Industries 
 BAE Systems 
 GE Aviation 
 GPMS Foresight 

Maintenance